Paul-Henri de Le Rue (born 17 April 1984) is a French snowboarder who competed at the 2006 Winter Olympics in Turin, Italy. de le Rue won bronze in the men's snowboard cross event and is currently competing in the Freeride World Tour.

He is the brother of snowboarders Xavier de Le Rue and Victor de Le Rue.

References 

1984 births
Living people
Snowboarders at the 2006 Winter Olympics
Snowboarders at the 2010 Winter Olympics
Snowboarders at the 2014 Winter Olympics
Olympic snowboarders of France
Olympic bronze medalists for France
French male snowboarders
Olympic medalists in snowboarding
Medalists at the 2006 Winter Olympics
Université Savoie-Mont Blanc alumni
Universiade medalists in snowboarding
Universiade bronze medalists for France
Competitors at the 2005 Winter Universiade
21st-century French people